Light From Uncommon Stars is a science fiction and fantasy novel by American author and poet Ryka Aoki. It was nominated for a 2022 Hugo Award for Best Novel.

Plot
Shizuka Satomi is the world's best violin teacher, known for coaching virtuosos who meet tragic ends. Years ago, she struck a deal with a demon that she would deliver seven souls to hell. To do this, she coaches ambitious violin students, then offers them fame and renown in exchange for their souls. Satomi has delivered six souls already, and with a year left on her contract, she needs one more student. She finds that student in Katrina Nguyen, a young transgender prodigy with little formal training.

As Satomi teaches Nguyen, she also meets Lan Tran, a starship captain and refugee disguised as a doughnut shop owner, who has brought her family to Earth to escape war and a deadly plague. The two strike up a tenuous flirtation, but their budding romance is imperiled by Satomi's deal with the demon and Tran's tumultuous galactic past.

Reception
Light From Uncommon Stars was nominated for the 2022 Locus Award for Best Fantasy Novel, 2022 Mythopoeic Fantasy Award for Adult Literature, and 2022 Hugo Award for Best Novel. Light From Uncommon Stars was named A Kirkus Best Book of 2021, was the 2022 Alex Award Winner, was a 2022 Stonewall Book Award winner and made the New York Public Library Top 10 list of 2021.

In a review for Locus, Caren Gussoff praised the novel's portrayal of women and its use of speculative fiction tropes to explore the meaning of womanhood in the modern day. However, Gussoff criticized the male characters as "two-dimensional 'not-women'" and thought that the ending was "too sweet" given the stakes of the novel.

In a review for Tor, Maya Gittelman called the novel "one of the best speculative novels I’ve ever read" and that it "reminds me what genre is capable of."

References 

2021 American novels
2020s LGBT novels
Novels set in Los Angeles
Novels with gay themes
Tor Books books
Literature by Asian-American women